Four ships of the French Navy have been named Juste ("Just"):

 , a 36-gun ship of the line
 , a 64-gun ship of the line
 , a 74-gun ship of the line
  (1784), an 80-gun ship of the line, renamed Juste in 1792.

See also

Sources and references 
 

French Navy ship names